Derrylough may refer to:
Derrylough, County Clare, a townland in County Clare, Ireland
Derrylough, County Cork, a townland in County Cork, Ireland
Derrylough, County Down, a townland in County Down, Northern Ireland
Derrylough, County Kerry, a townland in County Kerry, Ireland
Derrylough, County Longford, a townland in County Longford, Ireland